Leonardo Binchi (born 27 August 1975) is an Italian water polo player who competed in the 2000 Summer Olympics, in the 2004 Summer Olympics, and in the 2008 Summer Olympics.
height: 200 cm

References

1975 births
Living people
Italian male water polo players
Olympic water polo players of Italy
Water polo players at the 2000 Summer Olympics
Water polo players at the 2004 Summer Olympics
Water polo players at the 2008 Summer Olympics
Sportspeople from the Province of Livorno